Lars Lokotsch (born 17 May 1996) is a German professional footballer who plays for Fortuna Köln as a striker.

Career
Born in Hennef, Lokotsch spent his early career in the German lower leagues, playing for FC Hennef 05, FV Bad Honnef, TuS 05 Oberpleis, Bonner SC, TV Herkenrath and SV Rödinghausen.

In August 2020 he signed for Scottish club Livingston. He moved on loan to Raith Rovers in October 2020.

He returned to Germany in January 2021, joining 3. Liga club FSV Zwickau.

References

1996 births
Living people
German footballers
Association football forwards
FC Hennef 05 players
Bonner SC players
SV Rödinghausen players
Livingston F.C. players
Raith Rovers F.C. players
FSV Zwickau players
SC Fortuna Köln players
Regionalliga players
Scottish Professional Football League players
German expatriate footballers
German expatriate sportspeople in Scotland
Expatriate footballers in Scotland